
Greenfeld is a surname, which may refer to:

 Alon Greenfeld, an Israeli chess grandmaster
 Boruch Greenfeld, a rabbi and Torah scholar
 Josh Greenfeld (1928–2018), an author and screenwriter mostly known for his screenplay for the 1974 film Harry and Tonto
 Karl Taro Greenfeld, a journalist and author known primarily for his articles on life in modern Asia
 Liah Greenfeld, director of the Institute for the Advancement of the Social Sciences at Boston University
 Sherman Greenfeld
 Tzvia Greenfeld
 Yehuda Gruenfeld (Greenfeld)

Grinfeld 

 Alla Grinfeld (born 1953), Russian-American woman grandmaster chess player
 Nadejda Grinfeld (1887–1918), a Bessarabian politician
 Pavel Grinfeld, an applied mathematician

Grynfeld 

 Izaak Grynfeld (1912–?), a Polish–Israeli chess master

See also 
 Grünfeld
 Greenfield (disambiguation)
 Greenbaum
 Greenberg
 Greenstein (disambiguation)
 Greenwald
 Szlachta polska na Wołyniu

References 

Jewish surnames
Germanic-language surnames
Yiddish-language surnames

de:Greenfeld
ru:Гринфельд